Schimper is a surname. Notable people with the surname include:

 Andreas Franz Wilhelm Schimper (1856–1901), botanist and phytogeographer
 Georg Wilhelm Schimper (1804–1878), German botanist and naturalist, born in Reichenschwand
 Karl Friedrich Schimper (1803–1867), German naturalist and poet
 Wilhelm Philippe Schimper (1808–1880), German-French botanist, born in Dossenheim-sur-Zinsel, a town near the River Rhine